Victoria Azarenka was the defending champion but she chose to compete in 2010 Dubai Tennis Championships instead.Maria Sharapova won in the final 6–2, 6–1 against Sofia Arvidsson.

Seeds

Draw

Finals

Top half

Bottom half

External links
Main Draw
Qualifying Draw

Singles
2010 in sports in Tennessee
2010 WTA Tour